Teatro Coccia ("Coccia Theatre") is the main opera house in Novara (as well as one of the major traditional Italian theatres), and is also the most important "historical" theatres in Piedmont. It faces along via Fratelli Rosselli, and delimits piazza dei Martiri to the west and piazza Giacomo Puccini to the east.

History
Back in the day, Novara did not have a permanent theatre, and operas took place in private venues, such as noblemen's rooms and courts. The preferred venue was Casa Petazzi, equipped with a gallery and boxes. Count Luigi Maria Torinelli, together with the newly formed Società dei Palchettisti (English: Society of Box Holders), provided the funds for a new theatre. The new theater was called Teatro Civico, also known as Teatro Nuovo. Construction works started in 1777. The opera house was completed in two years, being inaugurated in 1779 (with Medonte re d'Epiro by Giuseppe Sarti) on a project of Cosimo Morelli. The Galliari brothers completed the decorations on the interior, as well as the stage curtain. On the latter, they depicted Hercules, the mythological founder of the city. The boxes were covered in blue silk, and they held carved seats in rich brocade. Luigi Canonica restructured the Civico/Nuovo in 1830. Between 1853 and 1855 the Teatro Sociale, a second theatre, opened in Novara. A fierce competition between the Teatro Sociale, hosting minor companies and promoting young talents, and the Teatro Civico/Nuovo, later renamed Teatro Antico, ensued. When Carlo Coccia died in 1873, the Antico's name was changed again, in Teatro Coccia.

The municipal council of Novara acquired both theatres in 1880, willing to replace them with a new opera house, since the Teatro Nuovo's capacity was considered inadequate to the demands of the day, as a result, in 1886 the Teatro Nuovo was demolished. At that time, in fact, the city saw a notable demographic growth and an affirmation of the bourgeoisie, increasingly turning to the world of culture, where the interest in theatrical performances was not limited only to the noble and prestigious families of Novara but involved the rest of the citizenship. Already around 1860 the Novara architect Alessandro Antonelli had proposed the merger of the Teatro Nuovo with the Teatro Sociale, to unify the various types of shows in a single building, but the majestic project was judged too expensive and disproportionate to the demands and financial resources of the city.

On 13 April 1873, in Novara, Carlo Coccia, who had been for more than thirty years master of the Cappella del Capitolo del Duomo (which boasts an important tradition of opera masters, such as Pietro Generali, Saverio Mercadante and Antonio Cagnoni), as well as director of the Civic Institute of Music "Brera", died. As mentioned, the Teatro Nuovo, which for some time had required its own name, to worthily honour the distinguished musician, took the latter's name on 6 July of the same year. The contract of 9 March 1886, was entrusted to the Milanese architect Giuseppe Oliverio to the detriment of the too expensive project developed by Andrea Scala.

Architecture
In 1886 work began on the new Coccia; a lot of material from the previous theatre was used, which was almost completely demolished.

The new complex occupied an area four times larger and was oriented differently than the old theatre, with the entrance on the current via Fratelli Rosselli instead of today's largo Puccini. The external perimeter was surrounded by a porch in pink Baveno granite, with Doric style columns, and by a single floor with huge windows (alternating, also, with Ionic style columns).

Even today the grandeur of the horseshoe-shaped room is striking, surrounded by three orders of large boxes, the first gallery and the loggione, all decorated in the Renaissance style, with a series of Corinthian cast-iron columns surmounted by a sculpture depicting a swan. The capacity of the hall was 1500 seats, with a maximum of 1800 people; the latest restoration works, however, have reduced the capacity, bringing the number of seats to 918. The proscenium is 14 metres long, the depth is 23 metres, while the scenic tower of the grating is 22.5 metres high. There is also another hall for shows, called "Piccolo Coccia", with a capacity of 200 seats. The last restoration, completed in 1993, has brought back the original colours of the room (velvets in antique pink, ivory and gold decorations), after the changes that took place in the 20s/30s of the last century, which had replaced the upholstery with the red colour, and made total gilding of the parapets of the boxes.

Great debuts and artistic activity

The inauguration of the new Coccia Theater took place on the evening of 22 December 1888, with the opera Les Huguenots by Giacomo Meyerbeer, directed by the great virtuoso conductor Arturo Toscanini. Probably due to the complexity of the music, the inaugural opera was not well received. The Maestro Toscanini would direct in the Novara temple also Aida and La forza del destino by Giuseppe Verdi, as part of the inaugural season of the theater, conducted by Toscanini. On 21 December 1893, the second version of Giacomo Puccini's Manon Lescaut was performed for the first time at the Coccia. At the turn of 1895 and 1896, Maestro Antonino Palminteri directed respectively Tannhäuser by Richard Wagner and Loreley by Alfredo Catalani. In December 1900 Antonino Palminteri returned to Coccia to conduct Tosca and the success was so resounding that La Stampa expressed itself as follows: "The Tosca at the Coccia. As for the [...] splendid performance, the orchestra conducted by Palminteri, which he played with such confidence that it certainly did not reveal it was a first performance. And credit for this goes to maestro Palminteri who was able to give impetus, color and effectiveness [...] and therefore Puccini's music was well enjoyed." Giacomo Puccini sent to Maestro Antonino Palminteri a telegram reading : "Giacomo Puccini gratefully rejoices with the Egr. M° Palminteri and with the performers for the success obtained in Novara [...] Greetings and best wishes, G.Puccini."

An article in the Corriere della Sera of 1932 defined the Coccia theater as the antechamber for the Teatro alla Scala. This flattery is due to the fact that many of the great artists of the world opera scene made their debut on the Novara stage, such as the soprano Carmen Melis in Iris by Pietro Mascagni (1905/06 season), the soprano Gilda Dalla Rizza in La forza del destino by Giuseppe Verdi (1912/13 season), the tenor Antonio Melandri in Lucia di Lammermoor by Gaetano Donizetti (season 1922/23), soprano Sara Scuderi in Il Trovatore by Giuseppe Verdi (season 1924/25), the Novara tenor Angelo Badà (one of the most famous supporting actors of the early 1900s). In recent years, the prestigious sticks of Gino Marinuzzi, Antonino Palminteri, Lorenzo Molajoli, Pietro Fabbroni, Napoleone Annovazzi, Pietro Mascagni, Giuseppe Podestà, Alberto Franchetti, Federico Del Cupolo and Arturo Lucon (who will be the artistic director of the Coccia from 1945 until his death in 1950) dominated the podium of the Novara theater. It should also be noted of the many presences of artists such as Mafalda Favero, Gina Cigna, Lina Pagliughi, Toti Dal Monte, Rosetta Pampanini, Lina Bruna Rasa, Clara Petrella, Bianca Scacciati, Mercedes Capsir, Giuseppina Cobelli, Tito Schipa, Augusto Ferrauto, Aureliano Pertile, Carlo Galeffi, Luciano Neroni, Giulio Neri, Galliano Masini, Mario Filippeschi, Giuseppe Valdengo, Antonio Salvarezza, Mariano Stabile, Giovanni Inghilleri and Enzo Mascherini.

The 1940s saw another great debut (despite the world conflict, the theatre would continue its activity): on the podium of the "Coccia" stepped for the first time Novara's own Guido Cantelli with La traviata by Giuseppe Verdi (with Gina Cigna). Cantelli in 1943, after the huge success, directed Madama Butterfly by Puccini, a second Traviata with Margherita Carosio, Afro Poli and Giacinto Prandelli, the Werther by Jules Massenet (with Giovanni Malipiero), and in 1945 Tosca. In the following years, up to the end of the 70s, in the Novara seasons the big names were always protagonists, indeed Renata Tebaldi, Mario Del Monaco, Giuseppe Di Stefano, Boris Christoff, Virginia Zeani, Anna De Cavalieri, Ebe Stignani, Giulietta Simionato, Nicola Filacuridi, Aldo Protti, Anna Moffo, Rita Orlandi Malaspina, Margherita Guglielmi, Giulio Fioravanti, Gianna Galli, Bonaldo Giaiotti and Giovanna Casolla came to perform at the Novara theater. The most assiduous conductors of these years are Franco Patanè, Ermanno Wolf-Ferrari, Napoleone Annovazzi, Alberto Zedda and Armando Gatto. In the 1964/65 season, Luchino Visconti directed La traviata.

Another great debut at the Coccia theatre was that of Riccardo Muti, winner of the "Cantelli Award" in 1967, a competition for young conductors.

In 1983 the sopranos Daniela Dessì, in L'elisir d'amore by Gaetano Donizetti, and Denia Mazzola Gavazzeni, in A Masked Ball by Giuseppe Verdi, made their debut at the Coccia. In 1986 it was then the turn of the tenor Luca Canonici in Rigoletto by Verdi; this was the last year before the big restoration. The theatre, which is still owned by the "palchettisti's" society, was sold to the municipality in 1986 (on a proposal strongly supported by Umberto Orsini from Novara), which assumed all the rights for the adaptation and renovation. The reopening took place in 1993 with a concert by the La Scala Philharmonic Orchestra conducted by Riccardo Muti, and the opera season reopened with the opera Les Huguenots by Meyerbeer, with Katia Ricciarelli, Nikola Gjuzelev and the debutante Paoletta Marrocu. In the following years, the Novarese stage was walked by such singers as Luciana Serra, Cecilia Gasdia, Tiziana Fabbricini, Daniela Lojarro, Enzo Dara, Alberto Gazale, Franco Vassallo (who made his debut at the Coccia with L'amico Fritz in 1994), Marco Berti, Giorgio Surian, Patrizia Ciofi, Giorgio Zancanaro, Stefania Bonfadelli, Dīmītra Theodosiou, Roberto Aronica, Veronica Simeoni, Bruno Praticò and Jessica Pratt; conductors and directors such as Nello Santi, Matteo Beltrami, Andrean Battistoni, Bruno Aprea, Franco Zeffirelli, Beppe de Tomasi, Pierluigi Pizzi, Giorgio Gallione, Alberto Fassini, Renato Bonajuto, Dario Argento, Daniele Abbado.

Most performed operas at the Coccia Theatre since 1888

Guido Cantelli Award

On 3 October 1961, the first edition of the "Guido Cantelli Award" took place in the Coccia theatre. This competition, which was won by numerous world-famous conductors, ran until 1980.

Gallery

References

Music venues completed in 1888
Opera history
Opera houses in Italy
Theatres completed in 1888
Theatres in Italy
Tourist attractions in Piedmont
1888 establishments in Italy
Neoclassical architecture in Novara